SS Jan Pieterszoon Coen was a Dutch passenger ship named after a former Governor-General of the Dutch East Indies  that was scuttled as a blockship during the German invasion of the Netherlands in May 1940 in the port of IJmuiden, North Holland to prevent the German Navy from entering the port.

Construction 
SS Jan Pieterszoon Coen was ordered on 27 December 1912 and laid down on 14 October 1913 at the Nederlandsche Scheepsbouw Maatschappij shipyard in Amsterdam, Netherlands. Christened by Miss Cornelia Anna Clasina den Tex the ship was launched on 30 September 1914. She was completed and acquired on 17 June 1915 making her maiden voyage on 11 September 1915.

Jan Pieterszoon Coen had seven decks, three continuous the full length of the ship, with a shelter deck. Eight watertight bulkheads divided the ship into nine watertight compartments with ten watertight doors capable of being closed remotely from the bridge.

Eight single ended forced draft Scotch boilers with two furnaces each provided steam for two triple expansion engines with an indicated horsepower (IHP) of 6,000, registry showing nominal horsepower (NHP) of 1,364, driving twin screw propellers. Boilers and engines were manufactured by Nederlandche Fabrik van Werktuigen and SpoorwegMaterieel, Amsterdam. The ship was electrically lighted throughout with some electrical auxiliaries including one steering engine, another being steam driven as were the cargo working winches.

As built the ship had accommodation for 202 first class passengers in 107 cabins and four suites, 128 second class passengers in 49 cabins, 46 third class passengers in 16 cabins and 42 fourth class passengers. First class passengers had access to a deck saloon, a verandah cafe, smoking room, nursery, gymnasium, photographic dark room and a 138-seat dining saloon. The crew was 161.

Navigation and safety equipment included wireless and submarine signals (bells) and fourteen boats, two powered, sufficient for all persons aboard.

Early career

Sea trials 
After being completed in June 1915, Jan Pieterszoon Coen became the new flagship of the Stoomvaart Maatschappij Nederland and was also the largest ship ever to be built in the Netherlands at the time. She completed her sea trials in IJmuiden in June 1915 with several passengers aboard, including the company's president J.B.A Jonckheer, four ministers with their spouses, the Mayor of Amsterdam with his spouse and two law enforcers. There were also a high number of officials, important business relation officials and the supervisory boards and the boards of shipyard and shipping company of the SMN.

The ship's Master at the time was Captain H.G.J Uylkens who led the ship to open seas together with the tugboat Cycloop van Zurmülen. The ship sailed South past Zandvoort, Katwijk, Noordwijk and Scheveningen. During lunch however, a submarine was spotted by the guests and crew. Everyone became worried at first, but it was soon clear that it was a Dutch submarine that was given orders to guide Jan Pieterszoon Coen back to IJmuiden. The ship completed her sea trials and arrived back in IJmuiden without incident.

Active service 

On 11 September 1915 at 3PM, Jan Pieterszoon Coen left Amsterdam, Netherlands for her maiden voyage to Batavia. She sailed through the Mediterranean Sea and the Suez Canal to reach her destination.

SS Jan Pieterszoon Coen left Amsterdam for Batavia again on 1 Januari 1916, but this time she would sail around Cape of Good Hope and Cape Town to reach Batavia. She would arrive on 17 February 1916 before returning to the Netherlands, where she arrived on 6 May. After the war, the ship would continue to sail the Amsterdam – Batavia route.

Later service and end 
Jan Pieterszoon Coen left Batavia for the last time on 28 June 1939 and was stationed in Amsterdam on 29 July 1939 where she was waiting to be scrapped. However, due to the outbreak of the Second World War, the ship was needed again and she made two short voyages to Lisbon, Portugal, in order to retrieve passengers from the MS Oranje.

When the German Army invaded the Netherlands in May 1940, the Royal Netherlands Navy made a plan which involved scuttling Jan Pieterszoon Coen at the entrance of the port of IJmuiden in order to prevent German warships entering the harbor. The plan was set in motion in the night of 14 May 1940, Captain R. van Rees Vellinga sailed Jan Pieterszoon Coen from Amsterdam to IJmuiden. Once there, the ship was supposed to be escorted to the harbor entrance by two tugboats, but they were accidentally sunk too early. As a solution to the problem, The Royal Netherlands Navy ordered the tugboat Atjeh and a minesweeper to tow the ship into place. The tugboat and minesweeper towed the ship into place with much difficulty due to the tide change. The ship was positioned with the bow to the Southern pier and the stern to the Northern pier of the port entrance. The explosives which were previously installed on the ship were detonated and the ship sank between the piers. Her upper decks were still sticking out of the water due to the shallow depths. The plan was successful and the ship prohibited German ships to enter the harbor, the Netherlands however surrendered to the Axis powers and was occupied by Nazi-Germany.

Wreck 
The German Army emptied the ship of movable property during 1940, they could do this because the ship was mostly above water. Rijkswaterstaat was thinking of salvaging Jan Pieterszoon Coen, since the ship was mostly intact and in shallow waters. But due to a series of storms, the ship sank deeper into the sand. In 1941, a 50-meter portion of the stern was removed so big ships could sail into the harbor again.

During the remainder of the war, Jan Pieterszoon Coen sank deeper into the sea and her upper decks were severely damaged and deteriorated by the strong waves that constantly pounded the ship. The funnels and some decks had also collapsed during this period. After the war in May and June 1945, the Royal Netherlands Navy with help from the Royal Navy, destroyed what was left of the ship with depth charges. However, a lot of debris was left in the entrance and the Dutch government was forced to clean up the debris from the bottom of the sea in 1968 so bigger ships could sail into the harbor without problems.

Footnotes

References

1914 ships
Passenger ships of the Netherlands
Steamships of the Netherlands
Ships built by Nederlandsche Scheepsbouw Maatschappij
Ships sunk with no fatalities
Ships sunk by non-combat internal explosions
Maritime incidents in May 1940
Shipwrecks in the North Sea
World War II shipwrecks in the North Sea
World War II ships of the Netherlands